Pio Chiaruttini (June 21, 1901 in Bozzolo – June 6, 1985 in Botticino), was an Italian businessman and inventor.

Biography 
In 1921 started to work in Calzificio Ferrari in Botticino.It proves to be a great expert in mechanical textile, and he is appointed foreman at the factory of Roberto Ferrari.In 1942, he decided to open his first business venture, producing silk stockings and women buying the raw material from the factory founded by Don Arcangelo Tadini in Botticino.

Patents 
In 1953 Pio settles patent office several industrial inventions, including the following: "Dispositivo per l'esecuzione di rigature o punteggiature in rilievo su calze in genere da montare su macchine circolari a doppia alimentazione di filato".Basically, the patent will henceforth produce industrially the famous stocking with the line (seam), before realized only going over the stocking with an overlock machine.

Further reading 
 Maurizio Argetta e Walter Scotti, 150 ANNI DI BRESCIA

See also
 Stocking
 Botticino

20th-century Italian businesspeople
20th-century Italian inventors
1985 deaths
1901 births